Castagnole delle Lanze is a comune (municipality) in the Province of Asti in the Italian region Piedmont, located about  southeast of Turin and about  south of Asti.

The municipality of Castagnole delle Lanze contains the frazioni (subdivisions, mainly villages and hamlets) Annunziata, Carossi, Farinere, Olmo, Rivella, San Bartolomeo, San Grato, San Defendente, San Rocco, San Pietro, Santa Maria, Valle Tanaro, and Val Bera.

Castagnole delle Lanze borders the following municipalities: Castiglione Tinella, Coazzolo, Costigliole d'Asti, Govone, Magliano Alfieri, and Neive.

Demographic evolution

Twin towns — sister cities
Castagnole delle Lanze is twinned with:

  Brackenheim, Germany
  Charnay-lès-Mâcon, France 
  Zbrosławice, Poland
  Tarnalelesz, Hungary

References

External links
 www.comune.castagnoledellelanze.at.it

Cities and towns in Piedmont